The 1994 SCCA Pro Racing World Challenge season was the fifth running of the Sports Car Club of America's World Challenge series. To this date the 1994 season is the most recent in which an American manufacturer (Oldsmobile) won the touring car championship. The groups were changed from A, B, and C to World Challenge, Touring Car, and Super Production, reviving the class names not seen since 1991.

Results

References

GT World Challenge America
1994 in motorsport